Lothar Milde (born 8 November 1934) was an East German athlete who competed mainly in the discus throw. He was born in Halle an der Saale.

Milde competed at three Olympic Games winning the silver medal at the 1968 Summer Olympics in Mexico City, Mexico. He also finished 12th at the 1960 Games in Rome, Italy and 14th in qualifying, and therefore not making the final, at the 1964 Games in Tokyo, Japan. Milde also won four medals at the European Athletics Championships.

References

1934 births
Living people
Sportspeople from Halle (Saale)
German male discus throwers
East German male discus throwers
Olympic athletes of East Germany
Olympic athletes of the United Team of Germany
Olympic silver medalists for East Germany
Athletes (track and field) at the 1960 Summer Olympics
Athletes (track and field) at the 1964 Summer Olympics
Athletes (track and field) at the 1968 Summer Olympics
European Athletics Championships medalists
SC Chemie Halle athletes
Medalists at the 1968 Summer Olympics
Olympic silver medalists in athletics (track and field)